Yarmouth High School may refer to more than one high school:

In Canada

Yarmouth Consolidated Memorial High School located in Yarmouth, Nova Scotia.

In the United Kingdom

Great Yarmouth High School located in Great Yarmouth

In the United States

Yarmouth High School (Maine) in Yarmouth, Maine
Dennis-Yarmouth Regional High School located in South Yarmouth, Massachusetts.